The 2018 Dhivehi Premier League season is the fourth season of the Dhivehi Premier League, the top-tier football league in the Maldives. It is the second edition held according to its new format. The season features ten teams, increased from eight teams from last season; six teams from 2018 Malé League and four teams from 2018 Minivan Championship.

Qualified teams

''Note: Table lists clubs in alphabetical order.

Personnel

Note: Flags indicate national team as has been defined under FIFA eligibility rules. Players may hold more than one non-FIFA nationality.

Foreign players

League table
All ten teams play in the first stage. Afterwards, only the top eight teams play in the second stage.

Season statistics

Scoring

Top scorers

Hat-tricks 

 4 Player scored four goals
 5 Player scored five goals

References

Dhivehi Premier League seasons
Maldives
1